Face with Tears of Joy (😂) is an emoji that represents a crying with laughter facial expression. While it is broadly referred to as an emoji, since it is used to demonstrate emotion, it is also referred to as an emoticon. Since the emoji has evolved from numerous different designs pre-unicode, it has different names and meanings in different regions and cultures. It is also known as Tears of Joy emoji, lol emoji, joy emoji, laughing emoji, cry-laugh emoji, crying laughing emoji, or the laughing crying emoji. The emoji is used in communication to portray joking and teasing on messaging platforms and social media websites such as Facebook, Snapchat, Twitter and Instagram. The emoji is one of the most commonly used emojis in the Emoticons Unicode block. The Oxford Dictionary recognised the emoji as its Word of the Year in 2015 due to its common usage.

Development history

In general terms, emoji development dates back to the late 1990s in Japan. Two competing companies, NTT DoCoMo and Softbank created the first two emoji sets. Softbank's J-Phone launched in 1997, but due to the limited adoption of the product, it was not popular. The first popular set was designed by NTT DoCoMo employee Shigetaka Kurita in 1999, after he sketched illustrations to be used in text messages. Kurita's set contained colored images, but none of the 176 emojis represented emotions. Despite the media referring to Kurita as the father of the emoji, the Tears of Joy emoji cannot be traced back to his early work.

Since DoCoMo's i-Mode emoji set derived from a Japanese visual style commonly found in manga and anime, combined with kaomoji, they symbolise facial expressions. Emojipedia tweeted about the set in 2019, demonstrating what emojis were available in 1997. The original 1997 version of the Softbank set was in black and white and did contain faces with emotion, but only two, one smiley and one with a sad face. A colourful, often animated, face with tears of joy would appear in later versions of the Softbank set, from 2000 onwards.

The digital smiley movement was headed up by Nicolas Loufrani, the CEO of The Smiley Company. In 2001, The Smiley Company developed and launched The Smiley Dictionary. The Dictionary provided a list of emotions that could be used to communicate online. The smiley toolbar offered a variety of symbols and smileys and was used on platforms such as MSN Messenger. The Smiley Dictionary contained hundreds of yellow-faced emoticons, including a laughing emoticon. It is the oldest known laughing emoticon. Nokia, one of the largest telecoms companies globally at the time, were still referring to today's emoji sets as smileys in 2001. 

By 2010, when the Unicode Consortium was compiling a unified collection of characters from the Japanese cellular emoji sets, which would be included with the October 2010 release of Unicode 6.0,  a face with tears of joy was included in the au by KDDI and SoftBank Mobile emoji sets. Unicode released the set in 2010, but Apple first developed its emoji keyboard for the Japanese market and released it on their first iPhone in 2007, initially using the Softbank Private Use Area scheme prior to standard Unicode codepoints being assigned. The Tears of Joy emoji was released worldwide in 2011, following an iOS update. This along with other providers and online platforms taking similar routes with adoption of emoji keyboards, meant a boom in usage of emojis.

Cultural impact of emoji

In the mid-2010s, the "Face with Tears emoji" became mainstream. In 2015, FiveThirtyEight noted that 😂 was the second most used emoji on Twitter, appearing in 278 million tweets, only behind the "Hearts" emoji (♥️), which appeared in 342 million. That same year, Oxford University Press, along with SwiftKey explored the frequency and usage statistics for global emoji usage. They found that 😂 was globally the most used emoji that year, and was chosen as Oxford Dictionaries' Word of the Year for such, stating the emoji "was chosen as the 'word' that best reflected the ethos, mood, and preoccupations of 2015." SwiftKey further detailed that the emoji made up 20% of all emojis used in the UK in 2015, and 17% of those in the US, up from 4% and 9% respectively, from 2014. Oxford Dictionaries president Caspar Grathwohl explained Oxford's choice, stating, "emoji are becoming an increasingly rich form of communication, one that transcends linguistic borders."

In May 2015, Instagram posted a blog that highlighted user data, revealing that the emoji is the most used on Instagram. In December 2015, Twitter tweeted that the Face with Tears of Joy emoji was the most used emoji that year, used over 6.6 billion times.

On World Emoji Day 2017, Facebook founder and CEO Mark Zuckerberg shared the ten most used emojis on the Facebook platform; the Face with Tears of Joy emoji ranked #1 globally and in the UK, while also being one of the top three most used globally on the Messenger app. Additionally, SwiftKey announced that the emoji was the most used in the United Kingdom during 2016. In 2017, Time reported that for the third consecutive year the emoji "[reigned] supreme on social media".

Twitter users voted 😂 as the most popular emoji "of all time" in 2017, granting it the Lifetime Achievement Award in Emojipedia's annual World Emoji Awards.

The emoji started to decline in popularity around the early 2020s, because Generation Z began to associate it with older generations, thus perceiving it as "uncool". It has been predominately replaced by the sobbing emoji (😭) and skull emoji (💀) to express similar emotions. However, CNN did note that "sometimes teens and twenty-somethings use emoji -- like the laughing crying one -- ironically, such as by sending six or seven of them in a row to friends, to exaggerate it. But, overall, that emoji is a no-go." Whilst the emoji has maintained its popularity with millennials, Generation Z utilises the emoji as a form of irony. Following in the decrease in usage over Twitter, the Face with Tears of Joy emoji was briefly dethroned as the most popular Twitter emoji. Researchers speculate that this decrease in popularity is due to its over-saturation and overuse within online communities. In late 2021 and early 2022, however, it returned to the top of Twitter's most popular emoji.

Reception
In November 2013, Brenden Gallagher of Complex ranked the "Laughing Crying Face" emoji at #2 in his "Emoji Power Rankings", writing that "research courtesy of Complex Stats and Information indicates that the Laughing Crying Face has almost reached a point of complete saturation". In response to Oxford's choice to make "😂" their word of the year in 2015, Slate staff writer Katy Waldman commented that "😂 [is] the right linguistic incarnation of yet another complicated year, not to mention a good commentary on the very act of choosing a word of the year. What does it mean? Is it good or bad? It depends! With [the emoji's] intense and inscrutable emotional lability, [it] is less of a word and more of an invitation to invent some sort of meaning".

Regarding the reasoning behind the emoji's popularity, Fred Benenson, author of Emoji Dick, commented that "it is versatile. It can be used to convey joy, obviously, but also 'I'm laughing so hard I'm crying.' So you've got two basic, commonly occurring human emotions covered." Benenson also attributed the emoji's popularity to it being one of the better designed emojis from Apple. Abi Wilkinson, a freelance journalist writing for The Guardian, opined that the Face with Tears of Joy emoji is "the worst emoji of all", describing it as an "obnoxious, chortling little yellow dickhead [with] bulbous, cartoonish tears streaming down its face".

Encoding of emoji
The Face with Tears of Joy emoji is encoded as follows:

See also
 Pile of Poo emoji
 LOL

References

Further reading

External links

 Face with Tears of Joy at Emojipedia

2010s in Internet culture
2020s in Internet culture
Computer-related introductions in 2010
Individual emoji
Crying
Laughter
Symbols introduced in 2010